KMBC-TV (channel 9) is a television station in Kansas City, Missouri, United States, affiliated with ABC. It is owned by Hearst Television alongside CW affiliate KCWE (channel 29). Both stations share studios on Winchester Avenue in the Ridge-Winchester section of Kansas City, Missouri, while KMBC-TV's transmitter is located in the city's Blue Valley section.

KMBC-TV also serves as an alternate ABC affiliate for the St. Joseph market, as its transmitter also produces a city-grade signal that reaches St. Joseph proper and rural areas in the market's central and southern counties. The station is also available in that market on select cable providers (including Suddenlink Communications) as a secondary ABC outlet to KQTV (channel 2), which has served as the network's official St. Joseph station since it became a full-time affiliate in June 1967; KMBC-TV's near-ubiquitous cable distribution in St. Joseph dates back to KQTV's former status as a primary CBS affiliate from its September 1953 sign-on until the former KFEQ-TV disaffiliated from that network in 1967, a period in which the station supplemented its CBS offerings with a limited selection of ABC programs.

History

Early years: from two stations to one
The third and last VHF television allocation in the Kansas City market was hotly contested between two locally based companies which had each competed to become the granted holder of the construction permit to build the new station on VHF channel 9. The prospective licensees in question were the Cook Paint and Varnish Company and the Midland Broadcasting Company, which had respectively owned two of the area's AM radio stations – Cook was the operator of WHB (then at 710 AM, now at 810 AM), while Midland owned KMBC (980 AM, now KMBZ). Eventually, the companies reached an agreement to combine their individual inquiries for the permit and jointly bid for the license. Under the proposed deal, Cook Paint and Varnish and Midland Broadcasting agreed to an arrangement in which the two licensees would share the channel 9 allocation as well as a transmitter facility; although each company would structure their common television property as two separate stations, individually maintaining operational stewardship of their respective stations and operating from different studio facilities within the metropolitan area.

In June 1953, the Federal Communications Commission (FCC) granted the proposal made by the Cook/Midland venture, and awarded the individual licenses for which the two companies had applied. Channel 9 first signed on the air as a shared operation on August 2 of that year. The licensees borrowed the call letters of their shared television station from their respective radio properties: the Midland-owned station was assigned the call letters KMBC-TV and the Cook-owned station was assigned the calls WHB-TV. The combined operation shared the local affiliation rights to CBS, which had moved its programming from WDAF-TV (channel 4, now a Fox affiliate), a station that had carried the network on a part-time basis since it signed on as Kansas City's first television station in October 1949. Similar to the split-station arrangement that WHB radio had maintained three decades earlier with WDAF radio (610 AM, now KCSP; the WDAF calls on radio now reside on 106.5 FM), KMBC-TV and WHB-TV would each maintain 90 minutes of programming airtime on an alternating basis throughout its broadcast day, which initially ran daily from 8:00 a.m. to 12:00 a.m. (the WHB/WDAF radio sharing arrangement originated in 1922, when both stations transmitted on 730 AM and transferred frequencies when both moved to 680 AM in 1924; the timeshare ended when WHB radio moved to 710 AM in 1927).

With the KMBC/WHB operation having been on the air for only eight months, one of the licensees had negotiated a deal that would result in it buying out its partner in channel 9 and dissolving the split-station arrangement. In April 1954, Cook Paint and Varnish purchased Midland Broadcasting's television and radio holdings—KMBC-TV, KMBC radio and sister radio station KFRM (550 AM) in Concordia, Kansas—in a deal that transferred the rights to Midland's lease to the Victoria Theatre, at the intersection of East 11th Street and Central Avenue in Downtown Kansas City, to Cook. After Cook formally assumed ownership of the station on June 14 of that year, KMBC-TV began occupying channel 9 full-time, absorbing WHB-TV's share of the operation and the lease to the Victoria Theatre, wherein Midland had rented space in the lower floors beneath the building's performance stage since it purchased the facility in 1947 to house the operations of KMBC radio and later KMBC-TV. Cook Paint and Varnish subsequently sold WHB radio to Storz Broadcasting in order to comply with FCC rules of the time period that restricted a broadcasting company from owning more than two radio stations in a single media market.

In January 1955, the Meredith Corporation signed a multi-year agreement with CBS to affiliate three of the four television stations that the company owned at the time with the network. As part of the deal, Meredith agreed to affiliate KCMO-TV (channel 5, now KCTV) with CBS, as compensation for sister station KPHO-TV in Phoenix losing its affiliation with the network to KOOL-TV. KMBC-TV subsequently signed an affiliation agreement with ABC, granting it assumption of the Kansas City affiliation rights to that network from KCMO-TV, which had carried the network since its September 1953 sign-on in a dual-affiliation arrangement (KCMO also initially carried select programs from the DuMont Television Network on a part-time basis until the network ceased operations in August 1956). Channel 9 formally switched to ABC, becoming the market's first full-time affiliate of that network, in September of that year. During the late 1950s, the station also briefly maintained an affiliation with the NTA Film Network programming service.

In the winter of late 1958, Cook Paint and Varnish purchased KDRO-TV (channel 6) in Sedalia; the company subsequently changed that station's call letters to KMOS-TV on January 28, 1959. During that time, KDRO-TV had been serving the ABC affiliate for the far eastern portion of the Kansas City market as well as portions of north-central Missouri. However, the network refused to provide KDRO direct access to its programming feed in order to protect KMBC-TV, with which KDRO's signal overlapped in the western portions of the latter station's coverage area; this forced engineers at that station to have to switch to and from channel 9's broadcast signal whenever KDRO aired ABC network programming.

Metromedia ownership
In December 1960, Cook Paint and Varnish sold the KMBC television and radio stations, KMOS-TV and KFRM to New York City-based Metropolitan Broadcasting (later renamed Metromedia) for $9.65 million; Metropolitan subsequently spun off KMOS-TV and KFRM. In 1962, Metropolitan signed on a companion station on the radio side, KMBC-FM (99.7 FM, now KZPT); Metromedia would sell both of the KMBC radio stations to Bonneville International, the broadcasting arm of the Church of Jesus Christ of Latter-day Saints, in 1967 (although its former radio sisters had changed their call letters decades earlier, KMBC-TV has retained the "-TV" suffix in its legal call sign to this day).

Metromedia eventually took over management of the building housing KMBC's operations in 1974, after being granted a change to the terms of its lease, although the group honored the lease signed by the Lyric Opera of Kansas City in 1970—around which time it was renamed from Capri Theatre to the Lyric Theatre—that gave the repertory company permission to perform at the theatre.

Hearst Corporation ownership
In September 1981, Metromedia sold KMBC-TV and the lease to the Lyric Theatre to New York City-based Hearst Broadcasting in a deal worth $79 million for the television station alone. Under Hearst ownership, the station heavily invested in its news department and expanded its local news programming, which increased from seven hours per week at the time of the purchase to 20 hours by 1990.

Hearst sold the Lyric Theatre to the Lyric Opera in 1989, in order to allow repairs to the building that commenced after a piece of plaster fell onto the performance stage during a rehearsal session by the Kansas City Symphony to continue due to the expensive cost. After selling the building, in 1990, Hearst weighed plans to move KMBC-TV's operations to a new studio space elsewhere in the Kansas City metropolitan area; however, company management eventually decided to continue to operate the station out of the Lyric Theatre, with which the station entered into a leasing agreement after Hearst turned over ownership of the building.

Channel 9 would gain a sister television station in 1997, when Hearst Broadcasting—which was renamed Hearst-Argyle Television after Argyle Television Holdings II merged with Hearst's broadcasting unit (now named Hearst Television) that year—entered into a local marketing agreement to manage the operations of KCWB (channel 29, now CW affiliate KCWE), which signed on the air in September 1996 as the market's original affiliate of The WB (it would later assume the UPN affiliation from KSMO-TV (channel 62, now a MyNetworkTV affiliate) in August 1998, as part of a swap that resulted from then-owner Sinclair Broadcast Group's multi-station affiliation agreement with The WB). Hearst-Argyle Television continued to maintain operational responsibilities for KCWE until 2001, when its parent company, the Hearst Corporation, bought the channel 29 license outright by way of an indirect subsidiary (doing business as "KCWE-TV Company") separate from its broadcasting division.

In July 2005, Hearst-Argyle announced plans to construct a new  facility at the Winchester Business Center (located at 6455 Winchester Avenue, near Swope Park) in southeastern Kansas City, Missouri to house the operations of KMBC and KCWE. Construction of the facility—which was designed in the mold of the Spanish-inspired architectural style of Country Club Plaza, and built by Oklahoma City-based architecture firm Rees and Associates, which also designed the studio facilities of sister stations WDSU in New Orleans and WESH in Orlando—began later that month, and was completed in early August 2007. The modern purpose-built concrete and glass studio facility incorporates a master control facility with digital and high definition transmission processing equipment; a two-story  production studio; an expanded  newsroom; a satellite management center supporting downlink and uplink capabilities; a helistop for the station's "NewsChopper 9" helicopter; and surface parking for station employees and guests. The operations of KMBC and KCWE formally migrated to the Winchester Avenue studio on August 23, 2007, ending KMBC's 54-year tenure at the Lyric Theatre, which had earlier been sold by the Lyric Opera to real estate firm DST Realty.

In late March 2010, Hearst filed an application with the FCC to transfer the KCWE license from the KCWE-TV Company subsidiary to the Hearst Television unit; the transfer was completed on May 1 of that year, officially making KMBC-TV and KCWE directly owned sister stations. Although "KMBC Hearst Television Inc." remained the name of the licensing purpose corporation for KMBC-TV, "Hearst Stations Inc."—the licensee name for KCWE—is used instead for the copyright tag seen at the end of its newscasts (the KMBC-TV license was transferred to Hearst Stations Inc. on December 31, 2016).

KMBC-DT2
On February 26, 2008, KMBC-TV launched a digital subchannel on virtual channel 9.2 under the brand "First Alert Weather 24 Hours", initially serving as an affiliate of The Local AccuWeather Channel. The channel—which was immediately made available on the digital cable tiers of Time Warner Cable (on digital channel 1422), Comcast (on channel 247) and Everest Broadband (on channel 611)—provided regional and national forecasts provided by the AccuWeather-operated network, along with pre-recorded local forecasts presented by meteorologists from KMBC's "First Alert Weather" team (which were updated two to three times per day), and a half-hour block of syndicated children's programs compliant with FCC educational programming guidelines on Monday through Saturday afternoons.

On September 14, 2010, KMBC-DT2 launched "MOREtv Kansas City", a four-hour block of entertainment programs that aired in place of The Local AccuWeather Channel's prime time programming on Monday through Friday nights (the block's branding was inspired by the "MOREtv 29" moniker used by sister station KCWE as a UPN affiliate from January 1998 until September 2005). The block—which aired on the subchannel each weeknight from 6:00 to 11:00 p.m.—consisted mainly of general entertainment syndicated programs (featuring a selection of same-day or week-delayed rebroadcasts of first-run talk shows seen on KMBC's main channel, as well as shows exclusive to the subchannel); it also included an encore of KMBC-TV's weeknight 6:00 p.m. newscast, which aired on a half-hour tape delay at 6:30 p.m.

On June 21, 2011, as part of an affiliation agreement between Hearst Television and network parent Weigel Broadcasting, KMBC-DT2 became an affiliate of the classic television network MeTV; some of the syndicated programs that aired as part of the "MOREtv" block moved to sister station KCWE with the switch.

Programming
Syndicated programs broadcast on KMBC-TV include The Kelly Clarkson Show, and Entertainment Tonight.

KMBC-TV airs most of the ABC network schedule. Until January 2019, the station preempted the Sunday edition of ABC World News Tonight in favor of an hour-long local early evening newscast that preceded the ABC prime time lineup. (As a result, World News Tonight was only viewable in the Kansas City market on Monday through Saturday evenings, except when preempted by predetermined or unscheduled sporting event overruns.) KMBC-TV also currently airs some programs offered by ABC out of pattern. Until June 2022, KMBC has aired The View on a one-hour tape delay since its premiere on August 11, 1997; the station has delayed ABC Daytime programs that the network intended for its stations to air during the 10:00 a.m. (Central Time) hour dating back to the late 1970s. Since June 2022, KMBC has aired GMA3: What You Need To Know on an alternate feed at 11:00 a.m. due to the station's noon newscast. The weekend editions of Good Morning America and This Week also air outside of their intended time slots, with the former airing one hour earlier than recommended on both Saturdays and Sundays (transmitted live via the program's Eastern Time Zone feed), due to a secondary two-hour block of its morning newscast, FirstNews, on both days; while the latter airs on a half-hour delay to air religious programming following the secondary FirstNews block on Sundays.

Past program preemptions and deferrals
Over the years, KMBC has either broadcast several ABC programs outside their recommended time slots or preempted them altogether. In these and other instances, viewers within the Kansas City market could view the affected shows in their normal time slots if they received KQTV (channel 2) out of nearby St. Joseph, which became a full-time ABC affiliate in September 1967, and/or KTKA-TV out of Topeka, which signed on in February 1983.

Under Metromedia ownership, channel 9 declined to air The Brady Bunch when it debuted in September 1969, in favor of running movies in its time period, which effectively preempted most of ABC's Friday night lineup; the station resumed clearance of the sitcom the following year. It was also one of a small number of ABC affiliates that opted to preempt the ABC Evening News during the late 1960s and early 1970s, as well as one of a handful that declined carriage of the music series American Bandstand for part of its run throughout the 1960s until the mid-1970s. In addition to being viewable in the northern half of the market through KQTV, many of the ABC programs that were preempted by KMBC-TV during this period could also be viewed alternatively in the market on independent station KCIT-TV (channel 50, channel now occupied by Ion Television owned-and-operated station KPXE-TV) during its two years of operation from 1969 to 1971.

Beginning with the newsmagazine's debut in 1980, KMBC-TV delayed Nightline to midnight—90 minutes later than most ABC stations had carried it at the time, with the only instances in which Channel 9 carried the program in its network-designated time slot being for major breaking news events—in order to run off-network syndicated sitcoms in the time period following its 10 p.m. newscast, something KMBC continued to do even after many Big Three affiliates in large and mid-sized markets began restricting their off-network syndicated content to drama series scheduled to air on weekends; this decision had long been criticized by some members of ABC's management and even original Nightline anchor Ted Koppel. Jimmy Kimmel Live!, which has preceded Nightline on ABC's late-night schedule since the network switched the broadcast order of the two programs in January 2013, was also delayed by the station in a similar manner beginning at the talk show's debut in January 2003. On January 3, 2011, KMBC-TV pushed both Nightline and Jimmy Kimmel ahead a half-hour, starting at 11:37 p.m., citing shifting market conditions and a request by the network during negotiations with Hearst Television to renew its affiliation agreement with KMBC-TV that the station air both programs at earlier times. KMBC-TV would begin airing Jimmy Kimmel Live! and Nightline in ABC's intended time periods for both shows (with Kimmel now following its 10 p.m. newscast) on January 5, 2015.

From September 2006 until the program was dropped by ABC on August 28, 2010, KMBC-TV preempted the Power Rangers series that aired as part of the ABC Kids block due to the program's lack of educational content (as Hearst's other ABC stations opted to do with the series); the station also aired Kim Possible and Power Rangers SPD on tape delay on early Monday mornings before World News Now—instead of their normal Saturday morning time slot—during the 2005–06 television season for the same reason.

KMBC was also among the more than 20 ABC-affiliated stations owned by Hearst and various other broadcasting groups that declined to air the network's November 2004 telecast of Saving Private Ryan, because of concerns that the intense war violence and strong profanity that ABC opted against editing out of its broadcast of the 1998 World War II-set film would result in stations that aired it being fined by the FCC amid the agency's crackdown on indecent material following the Super Bowl XXXVIII halftime show controversy. The station, along with several other Hearst-owned ABC affiliates, chose to air the 1992 film Far and Away in its place; it was eventually determined that the movie's broadcast did not violate FCC regulations.

Sports programming
Since 1970, KMBC-TV has carried National Football League (NFL) games involving the Kansas City Chiefs through either ABC's simulcast of Monday Night Football or team-specific syndication arrangements with ESPN. From 1970 to 2005, most of the team's broadcasts on Channel 9 were ABC-televised prime time games selected to air on Monday Night Football, involving both opponents that are fellow members of the American Football Conference (AFC) and interconference matches with National Football Conference (NFC) teams.

In 1987, the station became the rightsholder to local simulcasts of regular season Chiefs games intended for exclusive cable broadcast on ESPN. Until ESPN's contractual rights to the package concluded in 2005, these involved games selected to air on Sunday Night Football, which resulted in KMBC tape delaying portions of ABC's Sunday prime time lineup (including the now-discontinued ABC Sunday Night Movie and ABC Movie of the Week presentations) to air after its 10:00 p.m. newscast on the night of the Chiefs broadcast in place of its regular schedule of syndicated programs. The simulcasts shifted to the team's Monday Night Football matchups after ESPN took over the rights to that package from ABC (in a compensation deal by the NFL to make up for the loss of Sunday Night Football to NBC) in 2006. Presently, the station reschedules ABC's Monday night schedule to air in place of the network's late night lineup to accommodate the game, with Dancing with the Stars (which ABC moved to Mondays in September 2006) airing after the late newscast on the affected live performance episode's original airdate, incorporating a separate voting window for Kansas City-area viewers under a clause in the program's voting regulations that account for preemptions by ABC stations for MNF telecasts involving local NFL franchises, or extended breaking news or severe weather coverage in Dancings normal timeslot.

Hearst Communications holds a 20% ownership stake in ESPN (the remaining majority interest and operational control of the network is maintained by ABC parent The Walt Disney Company, with Hearst acting more as a silent partner rather than an active participant in ESPN's management); as is the case with ABC's owned-and-operated stations, Hearst's television stations hold the right of first refusal for NFL game simulcasts from ESPN, which—as the telecasts are cable-originated—are required under NFL broadcasting rules to be simulcast on a broadcast television station in the local markets of both participating teams.

KMBC also aired select Major League Baseball (MLB) games involving the Kansas City Royals that ABC telecast between 1976 and 1989 (when the network held rights to the Monday Night Baseball package), and from 1994 to 1995 (under the Baseball Network partnership involving ABC and NBC, which was disrupted in its first year by the strike that brought an abrupt end to the 1994 season). Notable Royals telecasts that aired on Channel 9 during ABC's contractual tenures with the league included the team's second World Series appearance in 1985, which saw the franchise win the first of the two World Series titles it has earned to date.

News operation

KMBC-TV presently broadcasts 34 hours of locally produced newscasts each week (with five hours each weekday and 4½ hours each on Saturdays and Sundays); in regards to the number of hours devoted to local news programming, it is the third-highest newscast output among the Kansas City market's television stations. KMBC also produces 22 hours a week of local newscasts for CW-affiliated sister station KCWE (consisting of a two-hour weekday morning broadcast at 7 a.m., hour-long midday newscast at noon timeslot on weekdays and hour-long 9 p.m. newscast that airs seven nights a week).

News department history
During the late 1970s and into the 1980s, KMBC had the highest-rated local television newscasts in the Kansas City market. However, the station faced stiff competition during this period from KCTV, which ascended to first in late news with the success of main anchors Anne Peterson and Wendall Anschutz. In 1968, assignment reporter Larry Moore was appointed as the station's lead anchor; Moore's co-anchors during much of his tenure included Laurie Everett (1985–2001), Kelly Eckerman (2001–2013, as Moore's co-anchor on the 6 p.m. newscast) and Lara Moritz (2001–2011, as his co-anchor on the 10 p.m. newscast; Moore and Eckerman remain weekday evening co-anchors at the station as of 2016). Moore helmed KMBC's weekday evening newscasts in some capacity for 37 of his 41 years at KMBC-TV—with a four-year break from 1978 to 1983, while Moore took short-lived anchor jobs at ABC owned-and-operated station WLS-TV in Chicago and, later, CBS affiliate KPIX-TV in San Francisco—until his retirement from regular broadcasting on November 27, 2013, when he transitioned into an anchor emeritus role in which he contributed to special projects reports.

In 1966, Kansas City Chiefs quarterback Len Dawson became the station's sports director, a post he would hold until his death in 2022. He stepped back from regular anchor duties in 2009, though he filled in when main anchors Len Jennings (weekdays) and Karen Kornacki (weekends) are on leave. Dawson, also anchored HBO's Inside the NFL from 1980 to 2001 and served as an analyst for NBC and the Chiefs' radio network.

In December 1980, KMBC-TV hired Christine Craft to serve as co-anchor for its 5 and 6 p.m. newscasts. Although ratings for KMBC's newscasts had ascended to first place in the market during this time, a focus group recruited by station management to survey their opinion on its news product pilloried Craft—who was 36 at the time, five years older than her co-anchor Scott Feldman, then age 31—claiming that she was "too old, too unattractive and not deferential to men." Craft resigned from the station nine months later after rejecting a management-decided demotion to an assignment reporting position. She then filed a lawsuit against its then-owner Metromedia, accusing KMBC-TV management of both fraud and sexual discrimination, becoming one of the first such cases to be widely publicized in the United States. Craft initially won her case when it went to trial in 1983; although when the suit was retried on a second appeal three years later, the presiding judge ruled in favor of Metromedia (which, by then, had merged into News Corporation after it purchased Metromedia's major-market independent stations to later serve as the nuclei for the Fox Broadcasting Company).

The station launched a local morning newscast on December 1, 1987, when it launched the initially 30-minute traditional news program FirstNews, a program that evolved out of local news inserts it aired during World News This Morning, which was initially anchored by Maria Antonia and weather anchor Joel Nichols (Bryan Busby, who has served as chief meteorologist at KMBC since 1985, conducted the program's forecast segments for a few weeks prior to Nichols' hire). During the late 1980s and early 1990s, KMBC became engaged in very competitive race with KCTV and WDAF-TV for first place in overall news viewership, frequently trading places with both stations in certain time periods, although it ended the former decade in second place overall behind NBC affiliate WDAF-TV. After WDAF became a Fox affiliate in September 1994, KMBC-TV experienced a resurgence to first place, overtaking both KCTV and WDAF as the most watched television news operation in Kansas City. At present, channel 9 generally places first in the early evening time period among total viewers; it also battles KCTV for first place at 10 p.m., while continuing to battle WDAF for first place on weekday mornings. In November 2007, KMBC-TV's newscasts finished first in most news timeslots during the sweeps period, while tying for #1 with KCTV at 10 p.m. During the following sweeps month in February 2008, channel 9's newscasts won all of its time periods outright.

In 2007, the station's news department won seven Edward R. Murrow Awards—the most wins by any American television station—in the news series, feature, news documentary, spot news, continuing coverage, newscast and overall excellence categories. On August 23, 2007, beginning with the 5 p.m. newscast, KMBC-TV began broadcasting from its new purpose-built facility near Swope Park, which included a newly constructed set for its newscasts that was designed by FX Group. With the relocation, channel 9 became the first television station in the Kansas City market to begin broadcasting its local newscasts in high definition. On March 3, 2008, KMBC-TV debuted a two-hour extension of its FirstNews morning newscast, from 7 to 9 a.m. on CW affiliate KCWE. For many years, KMBC management cited concerns with cannibalizing the station's audience as its reasoning for not expanding news offerings to its sister station.

On November 13, 2008, Channel 9 again became the focus of a lawsuit filed against the station, parent company Hearst-Argyle Television and Wayne Godsey, then-general manager of KMBC/KCWE, by anchor/reporters Maria Antonia (named as a plaintiff under her legal name, Maria Albisu-Twyman) and Kelly Eckerman, and general assignment reporter/former evening anchor Peggy Breit, alleging that station management engaged in age and gender discrimination, perpetrated "a hostile environment, permeated with threats, intimidation and disrespect" and demoted them in favor of younger women, while men much older than them stayed in their assigned anchor slots. Antonia, who was demoted from weekend evening anchor to assignment reporter in 2007, alleged that Godsey told her upon disclosing her demotion that she "[would] never anchor at Channel 9 again" and passed her over for a role offered to her to anchor the KCWE FirstNews broadcast in favor of a woman in her 20s. Eckerman, who had been co-anchor of the 5 and 6 p.m. newscasts since 1997, claimed that management promoted co-anchor Kris Ketz (who joined KMBC in 1983) to a more prominent role as weeknight early-evening anchor at the expense of her being reassigned from a weeknights-only to a Tuesday-to-Saturday shift to get him out from under the "shadow" of longtime main anchor Larry Moore. Breit—who was moved from a weekday daytime to a Tuesday-to-Saturday reporting slot in 2007—alleged that KMBC management passed over assignment reporters older in age for higher-profile shifts in favor of younger hires. Godsey was dismissed from the lawsuit in July 2009, on procedural grounds citing the plaintiffs' failure to name him in the complaint involving twelve other KMBC employees that was originally filed with the Missouri Human Rights Commission did not put him on notice that he was being held personally responsible for the work environment alleged in the suit; KMBC and Hearst-Argyle reached a settlement with the three anchors in September 2010.

On July 30, 2010, as most of its Hearst-owned ABC-affiliated sister stations did on that date, KMBC-TV added an hour-long extension of its weekend morning newscast at 8 a.m. This was followed on August 23 by the expansion of its weekday morning newscast into the 4:30 a.m. timeslot (NBC affiliate KSHB-TV (channel 41) also moved the start time of its morning newscast to 4:30 a.m. on that date). On September 14, 2010, KMBC-TV launched a half-hour weeknight-only 9 p.m. newscast on KCWE to compete with WDAF-TV's in-house 9 p.m. newscast and the KCTV-produced 9:00 p.m. newscast on MyNetworkTV affiliate KSMO; the program would eventually expand to a full hour on April 25, 2016, on the same date that KMBC also launched an hour-long late afternoon newscast at 4 p.m.

For the February 2011 sweeps period, KMBC-TV's newscasts garnered the #1 spot among the Kansas City market's television news operations; the station tied with WDAF-TV during the 6 to 7 a.m. hour, though channel 4's morning newscast beat KMBC's broadcast of Good Morning America during the 7 to 9 a.m. time period. The station's 5, 6 and 10 p.m. newscasts also placed first in their respective time slots; while its prime time newscast on KCWE placed second in the 9 p.m. time slot, slightly ahead of the KCTV-produced newscast on KSMO but well behind WDAF-TV, which has led the 9 p.m. hour since shortly after its switch to Fox and the related launch of its prime time newscast in September 1994.

On April 30, 2013, KMBC launched a separate website (www.kmbc.tv, and reformatted its weeknight 5 and 6 p.m. newscasts as well as the 8 a.m. hour of its FirstNews extension on KCWE to allow viewer comments, opinions and questions sent to the station's Facebook, Twitter and Google Plus accounts in a live chat hosted by the respective anchors of the aforementioned KMBC/KCWE newscasts.

To coincide with the introduction of the station's new logo on April 23, 2018, KMBC implemented an updated version of Hearst's standardized graphics package for its news-producing stations that are now optimized for the 16:9 format. This station, along with Pittsburgh sister station WTAE (also an ABC affiliate), were among the last stations in the Hearst Television portfolio to implement the updated graphics, a roll-out that began at Orlando sister station WESH (NBC) in mid-January.

Notable former on-air staff
 Walt Bodine (deceased)
 Jonathan Coachman (later with World Wrestling Entertainment, was with ESPN until October 2017, rejoined WWE in January 2018)
 Christine Craft
 Len Dawson (also former Kansas City Chiefs quarterback; host of Inside the NFL and analyst with NBC and the Kansas City Chiefs; died on August 24, 2022)
 Jeremy Hubbard (later at ABC News; now anchor at KDVR/KWGN-TV in Denver)
 Craig Sager (later with Turner Sports; died on December 15, 2016)

In popular culture
A September 1, 2010, interview with an eyewitness to an attempted robbery at a Kansas City-area gas station briefly became a social media sensation. KMBC-TV video of the interview was "songified" by The Gregory Brothers using pitch-correction software to become "Backin Up Song."

Technical information

Subchannels
The station's digital signal is multiplexed:

KMBC-TV is one of several Hearst-owned ABC stations that broadcasts its digital signal in the 1080i high definition format, instead of the network's preferred 720p format. KMBC's ABC-affiliated sister stations under Hearst including WMUR-TV in Manchester, New Hampshire; WTAE-TV in Pittsburgh; WCVB-TV in Boston; KOCO-TV in Oklahoma City and KETV in Omaha also transmit high definition programming content—including local and syndicated programs—in this format.

Analog-to-digital conversion
On February 19, 2009, KMBC-TV – after receiving permission from the FCC for a Special Temporary Authority permit – moved its digital channel allocation from VHF channel 7 to UHF channel 29, which had been vacated by sister station KCWE when it shut down its analog signal two months earlier on December 15, 2008 (KCWE physically transmits its digital signal on UHF channel 31).

The station shut down its analog signal, over VHF channel 9, on June 12 of that year, the official date in which full-power television stations in the United States were federally mandated to transition from analog to digital broadcasts (which was originally scheduled for February 17, but was pushed back after both Congressional branches passed measures to delay the complete conversion to ensure that all consumers receiving television broadcasts over-the-air had the equipment necessary to receive digital transmissions). Through the use of PSIP, digital television receivers display the station's virtual channel as its former VHF analog channel 9. Through its participation as a SAFER Act "nightlight" broadcaster, KMBC-TV kept its analog signal on the air until July 12 to inform viewers of the digital television transition through a loop of public service announcements from the National Association of Broadcasters.

References

External links
 
 KMBC-DT2 website

ABC network affiliates
MeTV affiliates
Metromedia
Television stations in the Kansas City metropolitan area
Television channels and stations established in 1953
1953 establishments in Missouri
Hearst Television